Wrexie Leonard (September 15, 1867 – November 9, 1937), also known as Louise Leonard,  was an American astronomer who worked as an assistant to Percival Lowell and published her observations of Mars. A crater on Venus is named for her.

Biography
Wrexie Louise Leonard was raised in Troy, Pennsylvania, and later moved to Boston. She was private secretary and assistant to the astronomer Percival Lowell for over two decades, from 1883 until Lowell's death. In 1895, she traveled to Africa with Lowell to look for a site for a new observatory, which was later established in Flagstaff, Arizona.

Leonard managed Lowell's correspondence, edited his many articles and speeches, and traveled with him extensively. She supervised the Lowell Observatory in Flagstaff during his absences. She  carried out astronomical observations at the observatory in Arizona, after it was built in 1894, studying the planets Mercury, Venus, Jupiter, and especially Mars. The observatory's logbooks show that "W.L.L." carried out observations frequently in the early years, and they include sketches that she made of Mars and Venus. This indicates that she was regularly using the large telescope a half century before it became common for women in astronomy to do so.

She also accompanied Lowell to Tacubaya, outside Mexico City, when the large Clark refractor was shipped there in 1896 for one of several oppositions of Mars that she would observe. In 1907, she published her drawings of Mars in Popular Astronomy with notes on the planet—its ice caps, Lowell's 'canals'— during some of the years when it was in opposition (1901, 1903, 1905). 

In 1904, Leonard was inducted into the Societé  Astronomique de France, then an unusual honor for a woman. She was also an honorary member of the Sociedad Astronomico de Mexico.

After Lowell's death in 1916, she moved back east. Five years later, she published a fond memoir, Percival Lowell: An Afterglow. The memoir includes a selection of extracts from the copious correspondence between Leonard and Lowell over the years. She lost money in the stock market crash of 1929 and moved afterwards into a home for the aged in Roxbury, Massachusetts.

Legacy

Leonard was the basis for the character Lulu in Jan Millsapps' 2014 novel Venus on Mars.

Notes and references

1867 births
1937 deaths
American women astronomers
People from Bradford County, Pennsylvania
Scientists from Pennsylvania
People from Boston
19th-century American astronomers
19th-century American women scientists
20th-century American astronomers
20th-century American women scientists